These are the films of Charles Laughton:

Filmography 
Unless otherwise stated the films are U.S. productions in black and white.

1928–1940 

<div style="font-size: 85%">
 Directed by James Cruze, H. Bruce Humberstone, Ernst Lubitsch, Norman Z. McLeod, Lothar Mendes, Stephen Roberts, William A. Seiter and Norman Taurog
</div style="font-size: 85%">

1941–1949 

<div style="font-size: 85%">
 Directed by René Clair, Edmund Goulding, Cedric Hardwicke, Frank Lloyd, Victor Saville, Robert Stevenson and Herbert Wilcox
</div style="font-size: 85%">

1951–1962

References 

Male actor filmographies
British filmographies
American filmographies